Mission: Bermuda Triangle was a motion simulator attraction that operated at the SeaWorld parks and Six Flags Worlds of Adventure. The ride was themed to the legend and mystery of the Bermuda Triangle. This attraction was replaced by Wild Arctic at the two SeaWorld parks.

Plot
Guests rode on a cabin designed as a submarine vessel as they dived into an underwater exploration through the depth of the coral reefs in the Bermuda Triangle to find a sunken ship. The ride used special effects to simulate the exploration. The captain was voiced by Robert Stack, famous as the host of the show Unsolved Mysteries.

The voyage starts as a scientific expedition to observe and document marine life such as coral reefs, sharks, dolphins, and a pod of humback whales, before receiving an emergency call from a sister sub claiming to have made an incredible discovery. Descending about a mile deep, the sub finds the lost wreck of the USS Cyclops (briefly mentioned in the preshow), and the captain of the sub agrees to stay on-site while the sister sub returns to the surface to refuel. An earthquake suddenly rocks the ship, forcing the sub to evade falling debris, before the wreck tips over and falls into the trench, it's wake current dragging the sub down with it. As the engines fail and the hull begins to strain under the increasing water pressure, a mysterious electric charge gathers along the hull of the Cyclops before blasting the sub, which suddenly rockets back towards the surface. Unable to explain the strange phenomena that saved them, the captain chalks it up to yet another mystery of the Bermuda Triangle as a helicopter arrives to retrieve the sub.

History
In 1989, Anheuser-Busch purchased the SeaWorld parks for $1.1 billion. Busch wanted to transform the parks from a zoo/aquarium to an amusement park to compete in the market with Disney parks and Universal Studios. In 1992, the chain joined in the theme park simulator wave popularized by Star Tours at Disneyland in 1987, when they announced plans for an attraction named Mission: Bermuda Triangle. The ride opened during the 1992 Memorial Day Weekend.

In August 1994, the Orlando location announced that it will be rethemed to Wild Arctic which opened in 1995. The San Diego location soon followed in 1997, closing their version (opened in 1994) to be replaced by the ride. Wild Arctic added animal exhibits at the exit of the motion simulators.

In 1999, SeaWorld Ohio, a SeaWorld park in Aurora, Ohio, announced plans to open Mision: Bermuda Triangle which opened in 2000. When it was added, it was the only ride at SeaWorld Ohio, as the park was forbidden to add any rides. The next year in 2001, SeaWorld Ohio merged with the adjacent Six Flags Ohio theme park to become Six Flags Worlds of Adventure, with the SeaWorld portion becoming the Wildlife Section area.

In March 2004, the theme park was sold to Cedar Fair for $145 million and reverted it back to the park's original name, Geauga Lake. The Six Flags branding was removed and the ride along with the other attractions in the Wildlife Section were replaced by the Wildwater Kingdom water park in 2005.

References

Amusement rides introduced in 1992
Amusement rides introduced in 1994
Amusement rides introduced in 2000
Amusement rides that closed in 1997
Amusement rides that closed in 2003
SeaWorld San Diego
SeaWorld Orlando
Geauga Lake
Simulator rides